Bonnet Peak is a massif consisting of three separate peaks. It is near the source of Johnston Creek although its southern and eastern slopes drain into the Cascade River. Named in 1890 due to its appearance with a cap of snow. It is located in the Sawback Range of Alberta.

References

Three-thousanders of Alberta
Alberta's Rockies